Armour (British spelling) or Armor (American spelling) is protective covering.

Armour or Armor may also refer to:

Military and naval 
 Armoured forces
 An armoured fighting vehicle
 Vehicle armour, protection for vehicles or warships
 The metal belt armor, deck armor, turret armor, and command citadel armor of battleship and cruisers
Personal armor, protection for individuals
Armor-piercing shot and shell, munitions designed to penetrate armor
SS Armour, a steamboat operating on the Magnetawan River in Ontario

Protection or technology 
 ARMOR Doppler Weather Radar
 Armor (hydrology), beaches, stream or river beds which have significant rock or boulder occurrence
 Armour (anatomy), anatomical body protection
 Armour Thyroid (or Armour brand medication), a thyroid supplement made of desiccated thyroid extract from pigs

Places 
 Armour, Nebraska, an extinct town in Pawnee County
 Armour, South Dakota, a city in and the county seat of Douglas County
 Armour, Ontario, a township
 Côtes-d'Armor,  Breton for "by the sea" and means the part of Brittany on or near the coast
 Armorica, an old name for Brittany, France
 Armor, New York

People 
Armour (surname)

Organizations 
 Armour and Company, slaughterhouse and meat packers
 Armour Mission, a charitable organization founded by Philip Danforth Armour
 Armour Institute of Technology (1893), merged with Illinois Institute of Technology in 1940

Media and entertainment
 Armor (novel), by John Steakley
 Armor (magazine), journal of the U.S. Army's Armor Branch
 Armor (comics), Marvel Comics character
 Armored (film), 2009, directed by Nimrod Antal
 Armor (album), by Janus
 A.R.M.O.R., Altered-Reality Monitoring and Operational Response, a sister organization to S.H.I.E.L.D. in the Marvel Comics universe
 "Armor", a song by Ronnie Radke from the 2014 mixtape Watch Me
 Armor, a 2018 album by Sara Bareilles
 "Armour" (Samantha Jade song), 2015
 "Armour" (Craig David song)
 Armors (band), an American alternative band
 Armour (Keyser), a painting by Ragnhild Keyser

See also 

 Under Armour
Chain mail